Hanhua Subdistrict is a subdistrict in Xinye County, Nanyang, Henan province, China. , it has 7 residential communities under its administration.

See also 
 List of township-level divisions of Henan

References 

Township-level divisions of Henan
Xinye County